Sękowo may refer to the following places:
Sękowo, Nowy Tomyśl County in Greater Poland Voivodeship (west-central Poland)
Sękowo, Szamotuły County in Greater Poland Voivodeship (west-central Poland)
Sękowo, Masovian Voivodeship (east-central Poland)
Sękowo, Warmian-Masurian Voivodeship (north Poland)